The Samuel D. Walker House, at 1119 Park Ave. in Park City, Utah, was built around 1895.  It was listed on the National Register of Historic Places in 1984.

It is a two-story frame hall and parlor plan house with a gable roof.  It was built originally as a one-story hall and parlor plan house.  Its first floor symmetric front has three bays:  window, door, window.

References

National Register of Historic Places in Summit County, Utah
Houses completed in 1895
1895 establishments in Utah Territory